Solid-state chemistry, also sometimes referred  as materials chemistry, is the study of the synthesis, structure, and properties of solid phase materials, particularly, but not necessarily exclusively of, non-molecular solids. It therefore has a strong overlap with solid-state physics, mineralogy, crystallography, ceramics, metallurgy, thermodynamics, materials science and electronics with a focus on the synthesis of novel materials and their characterisation. Solids can be classified as crystalline or amorphous on basis of the nature of order present in the arrangement of their constituent particles.

History

Because of its direct relevance to products of commerce, solid state inorganic chemistry has been strongly driven by technology. Progress in the field has often been fueled by the demands of industry, sometimes in collaboration with academia. Applications discovered in the 20th century include zeolite and platinum-based catalysts for petroleum processing in the 1950s, high-purity silicon as a core component of microelectronic devices in the 1960s, and “high temperature” superconductivity in the 1980s. The invention of X-ray crystallography in the early 1900s by William Lawrence Bragg was an enabling innovation. Our understanding of how reactions proceed at the atomic level in the solid state was advanced considerably by Carl Wagner's work on oxidation rate theory, counter diffusion of ions, and defect chemistry. Because of his contributions, he has sometimes been referred to as the father of solid state chemistry.

Synthetic methods
Given the diversity of solid state compounds, an equally diverse array of methods are used for their preparation.

Oven techniques
For thermally robust materials, high temperature methods are often employed.  For example, bulk solids are prepared using tube furnaces, which allow reactions to be conducted up to ca. 1100 °C, while temperatures up to ca. 2000 °C require the use of special furnaces consisting of tantalum resistance heating elements. Such high temperatures are at times required to induce diffusion of the reactants.

Melt methods
One method often employed is to melt the reactants together and then later anneal the solidified melt. If volatile reactants are involved, the reactants are often put in an ampoule that is evacuated of the mixture 

The bottom of the ampoule is kept in liquid nitrogen, and then sealed. The sealed ampoule is then put in an oven and given a certain heat treatment. In the presence of the molten flux, certain grains may grow rapidly within a matrix of finer crystallites. This produces abnormal grain growth (AGG), which may or may not be desired, to the produced solid.

Solution methods
It is possible to use solvents to prepare solids by precipitation or by evaporation. At times the solvent is used as a hydrothermal that is under pressure at temperatures higher than the normal boiling point. A variation on this theme is the use of flux methods, where a salt of relatively low melting point is added to the mixture to act as a high temperature solvent in which the desired reaction can take place. this can be very useful

Gas reactions

Many solids react vigorously with reactive gas species like chlorine, iodine, oxygen etc. Others form adducts with other gases, e.g. CO or ethylene. Such reactions are often conducted in tubes that are open-ended on both sides and through which the gasses are passed. A variation of this is to let the reaction take place inside a measuring device such as a TGA. In that case stoichiometric information can be obtained during the reaction, which helps identify the products.

Chemical transport reactions are used to purify and to grow crystals of materials. The process is often carried out in a sealed ampoule. The transport process entails the addition of a small amount of a transport agent, e.g., iodine, which generates a volatile intermediate species that migrates (transports). The ampoule is then placed in an oven with two temperature zones.  

Chemical vapour deposition is a method that is widely employed for the preparation of coatings and semiconductors from molecular precursors.

Characterization

New phases, phase diagrams, structures
Synthetic methodology and characterization often go hand in hand in the sense that not one but a series of reaction mixtures are prepared and subjected to heat treatment. The stoichiometry is typically varied in a systematic way to find which stoichiometries will lead to new solid compounds or to solid solutions between known ones. A prime method to characterize the reaction products is powder diffraction, because many solid state reactions will produce polycristalline ingots or powders. Powder diffraction facilitates the identification of known phases in the mixture. If a pattern is found that is not known in the diffraction data libraries an attempt can be made to index the pattern, i.e. to identify the symmetry and the size of the unit cell. (If the product is not crystalline the characterization is typically much more difficult.)

Once the unit cell of a new phase is known, the next step is to establish the stoichiometry of the phase. This can be done in a number of ways. Sometimes the composition of the original mixture will give a clue,

if only one product is found -a single powder pattern- or if one was trying to make a phase of a certain composition by analogy to known materials but this is rare.
Often, considerable effort in refining the synthetic methodology is required to obtain a pure sample of the new material.
If it is possible to separate the product from the rest of the reaction mixture, elemental analysis can be used. Another way involves SEM and the generation of characteristic X-rays in the electron beam. X-ray diffraction is also used due to its imaging capabilities and speed of data generation.

The latter often requires revisiting and refining the preparative procedures and that are linked to the question of which phases are stable at what composition and what stoichiometry. In other words, what the phase diagram looks like. An important tool in establishing this are thermal analysis techniques like DSC or DTA and increasingly also, due to the advent of synchrotrons, temperature-dependent powder diffraction. Increased knowledge of the phase relations often leads to further 

refinement in synthetic procedures in an iterative way. New phases are thus characterized by their melting points and their stoichiometric domains. The latter is important for the many solids that are non-stoichiometric compounds. The cell parameters obtained from XRD are particularly helpful to characterize the homogeneity ranges of the latter.

Local structure 
In contrast to the large structures of crystals, the local structure describes the interaction of the nearest neighbouring atoms. Methods of nuclear spectroscopy use specific nuclei to probe the electric and magnetic fields around the nucleus. E.g. electric field gradients are very sensitive to small changes caused by lattice expansion/compression (thermal or pressure), phase changes, or local defects. Common methods are Mössbauer spectroscopy and perturbed angular correlation.

Further characterization
In many cases, new solid compounds are further characterized by a variety of techniques that straddle the fine line that separates solid-state chemistry from solid-state physics. See Characterisation in material science.

Optical properties
For non-metallic materials, it is often possible to obtain UV/VIS spectra. In the case of semiconductors that will give an idea of the band gap.

Citations

External links

, Sadoway, Donald. 3.091SC; Introduction to Solid State Chemistry, Fall 2010. (Massachusetts Institute of Technology: MIT OpenCourseWare)

 
Materials science